Tazeh Kand-e Fakhrlu (also Romanized as Tāzeh Kand-e Fakhrlū; also known as Tāzeh Kand and Tāzeh Kand-e Fakhr ‘Alī) is a village in Oryad Rural District, in the Central District of Mahneshan County, Zanjan Province, Iran. At the 2006 census, its population was 296, among 62 families.

References 

Populated places in Mahneshan County